Antaeotricha renselariana is a moth in the family Depressariidae. It was described by Caspar Stoll in 1781. It is found in Panama, Suriname, French Guiana, Brazil (Amazonas, Para, Bahia) and Peru.

References

Moths described in 1781
renselariana
Moths of Central America
Moths of South America